The women's snowboard cross competition of the Vancouver 2010 Olympics was held at Cypress Mountain on February 16, 2010.

Results

Qualification

Elimination round

Quarterfinals
The top 16 qualifiers advanced to the quarterfinals round. From here, they participated in four-person elimination races, with the top two from each race advancing. 

Quarterfinal 1

Quarterfinal 3

Quarterfinal 2

Quarterfinal 4

Semifinals

Semifinal 1

Semifinal 2

Finals
Small Final

Large Final

Final Classification

References

External links
2010 Winter Olympics results: Ladies' Snowboard Cross, from http://www.vancouver2010.com/; retrieved 2010-02-15.

Snowboarding at the 2010 Winter Olympics
Women's events at the 2010 Winter Olympics